Giovanni "Nanni" Moretti (born 19 August 1953) is an Italian film director, producer, screenwriter, and actor.

His films have won accolades including a Palme d'Or at the 2001 Cannes Film Festival for The Son's Room, a Silver Bear at the 1986 Berlin Film Festival for The Mass is Ended and a Silver Lion at the 1981 Venice Film Festival for Sweet Dreams, in addition to the David di Donatello Award for Best Film on three occasions (for Caro diario in 1994, The Son's Room in 2001 and Il caimano in 2006).

Every film he has directed since Caro diario has been shown at the Cannes Film Festival, and in 2012 he was the president of the Official Competition jury.

Life and work
Moretti was born in Bruneck, Italy to Roman parents who were both teachers. His father was the late epigraphist Luigi Moretti, a Greek teacher at Sapienza University of Rome. His brother is literary scholar Franco Moretti.

While growing up Moretti discovered his two passions, the cinema and water polo. Having finished his studies he pursued a career as a producer, and in 1973 directed his first two short films: Pâté de bourgeois and The Defeat (La sconfitta). 

In 1976, Nanni Moretti's first feature film Io sono un autarchico (I Am Self-Sufficient) was released. In 1978, he wrote, directed and starred in the movie Ecce Bombo, which tells the story of a student having problems with his entourage. It was screened at the Cannes Festival. Sogni d'oro won the Silver Lion at the 38th Venice International Film Festival. La messa è finita won the Silver Bear – Special Jury Prize at the 36th Berlin International Film Festival. 

He may be best known for his films Caro diario (Dear Diary, 1993; followed in 1998 by a sequel, Aprile) and La stanza del figlio (The Son's Room, 2001), the latter of which won the Palme d'Or at the 2001 Cannes Film Festival.

Moretti has used certain actors several times in his films, generally playing minor roles. His father Luigi appears in 6 films, Dario Cantarelli and Mauro Fabretti in 5, Antonio Petrocelli in 4. More notable Italian actors he has employed frequently in his films include Silvio Orlando, who appears in 5 films (including the role of protagonist in Il caimano) and Laura Morante, who was featured in Sogni d'oro, Bianca and The Son's Room. 

Having played waterpolo in the B division of the Italian championship, his experience later inspired his film Palombella Rossa ("palombella," which literally means "little pigeon," refers to a type of lob shot). His other work has not been widely seen outside Europe, but within his country Moretti is known as a maker of wryly humorous and eccentric films, usually starring himself. His most recent role was in the film Mia Madre (My Mother, 2015)

Moretti is also an outspoken political leftist. In 2002, he organized street protests against the government of Silvio Berlusconi. Il caimano (2006) is in part about Berlusconi's controversies: in one of the three portraits of the Italian prime minister Moretti himself plays Berlusconi. Aprile also deals with Italy's political situation and Moretti's views on it. His 2011 film We Have a Pope screened In Competition at the 2011 Cannes Film Festival.

He lives in Rome, having been resident since birth, where he is co-owner of a small movie theater, Nuovo Sacher, named like this because of Moretti's passion for Sachertorte. The short film, Il Giorno della prima di Close Up (Opening Day of Close-Up, 1996), shows Moretti at his theatre attempting to encourage patrons to attend the opening day of Abbas Kiarostami's film, Close Up.

He is not religious. In his words, "I remember the shirts that said 'Thank God I'm an atheist'. Funny. But I do not think so. I'm not a believer and I'm sorry."

His 2015 film Mia Madre was selected to compete for the Palme d'Or at the 2015 Cannes Film Festival.

Filmography

Director
 I Am Self Sufficient (Io sono un autarchico, 1976)
 Un autarchico a palazzo (1977, TV movie)
 Ecce bombo (1978)
 Sweet Dreams (Sogni d'oro, 1981)
 Sweet Body of Bianca (Bianca, 1984)
 The Mass Is Ended (La messa è finita, 1985)
 Red Wood Pigeon (Palombella Rossa, 1989)
 Caro diario (1993)
 April (Aprile,1998)
 The Son's Room (La stanza del figlio, 2001)
 Il caimano (2006)
 We Have a Pope (Habemus Papam, 2011)
 Mia Madre (Mia madre, 2015)
 Three Floors (Tre piani, 2021)
 The Sun of the future (Il Sol Dell'Avvenir, 2023)

Short films
 La sconfitta (1973 short)
 Pâté de bourgeois (1973 short)
 The Only Country In The World (L'unico paese al mondo, 1994 short)
 Opening Day of Close-Up (Il Giorno della prima di Close Up, 1996 short)
 The Last Customer (2002 short)
 Il grido d'angoscia dell'uccello predatore (2003 short)
 L'ultimo campionato (2007 short)
 Diary Of A Moviegoer (Diario di uno spettatore, 2007 short of To Each His Own Cinema)
 Film Quiz (2008 short)
 Scava dolcemente l'addome (2013 short)
 Autobiografia dell'uomo mascherato (2013 short)
 Ischi allegri e clavicole sorridenti (2017 short)
 Piazza Mazzini (2017 short)

Documentaries
 Come parli frate? (1974 medium)
 The Thing (La cosa, 1990 medium)
 Santiago (2018 documentary)

Actor only
 Father and Master (Padre padrone, 1977) – directed by Paolo and Vittorio Taviani
 Riso in bianco: Nanni Moretti atleta di se stesso (TV movie, 1984) – directed by Marco Colli
 It's Happening Tomorrow (Domani accadrà, 1988) – directed by Daniele Luchetti
 The Yes Man (Il portaborse, 1991) – directed by Daniele Luchetti
 The Second Time (La seconda volta, 1995) – directed by Mimmo Calopresti
 Te lo leggo negli occhi (2004) – directed by Valia Santella – cameo
 Quiet Chaos (Caos calmo, 2008) – directed by Antonello Grimaldi
 Venanzio Revolt: i miei primi 80 anno di cinema (2016) – directed by Fabrizio Dividi, Marta Evangelisti, Vincenzo Greco – narrator
The Hummingbird (2022)

Awards

Cannes Film Festival
Prix de la mise en scène 1994: Caro diario
Palme d'Or 2001: The Son's Room
Prix de la FIPRESCI 2001: The Son's Room
Carrosse d'Or 2004
Rome's Award 2006: Il caimano
Ecumenical Prize 2015: Mia madre

Venice Film Festival
Silver Lion – Special Jury Prize 1981: Sweet Dreams
"Bastone Bianco" Filmcritic Award 1989: Red Wood Pigeon

Berlin International Film Festival
Silver Bear – Jury Grand Prix 1986: The Mass Is Ended
Jury C.I.C.A.E Award 1986: The Mass Is Ended

Chicago International Film Festival
Golden Plaque for Best Documentary Short Film 2003: The Last Customer
Silver Plaque for Best Screenplay 2008: Quiet Chaos

European Film Awards
FIPRESCI Prize 1994: Caro diario

São Paulo International Film Festival
Critics Award 1990: Red Wood Pigeon

Sudbury Cinéfest
Best International Film 1994: Caro diario

Sant Jordi Awards
Best Foreign Film 1995: Caro diario

Guild of German Art House Cinemas
Guild Film Award – Silver 2002: The Son's Room

David di Donatello
Alitalia Award 1986
Golden Medal of the City of Rome 1986
Best Actor 1991: The Yes Man
Best Film 1994: Caro diario
Best Film 2001: The Son's Room
Best Film 2006: Il caimano
Best Director 2006: Il caimano
Best Producer 2006: Il caimano
Best Documentary 2019: Santiago

Silver Ribbon
Best Story 1978: Ecce Bombo
Best Producer 1988: It's Happening Tomorrow
Best Story 1990: Red Wood Pigeon
Best Producer 1992: The Yes Man
Best Director 1994: Caro diario
Best Producer 1996: The Second Time
Best Director 2001: The Son's Room
Best Producer 2007: Il caimano
Best Director 2011: We Have a Pope
Best Story 2011: We Have a Pope
Best Producer 2011: We Have a Pope
Ribbon of the Year 2019: Santiago

Ciak d'oro Awards
Best Director 1986: The Mass Is Ended
Best Screenplay 1986: The Mass Is Ended
Best Director 1990: Red Wood Pigeon
Best Film 1994: Caro diario
Best Director 1994: Caro diario
Best Screenplay 1994: Caro diario
Best Film 2001: The Son's Room
Best Director 2001: The Son's Room
Best Film 2006: Il caimano
Best Director 2006: Il caimano
Best Screenplay 2006: Il caimano
Best Film 2011: We Have a Pope
Best Screenplay 2011: We Have a Pope
Best Director 2015: Mia madre
Honorary Ciak d'oro 2019

UBU Awards
Best Italian Movie 1977/78: Ecce Bombo

Globi d'oro Awards
Best Debut 1977: I Am Self Sufficient
Best Film 1994: Caro diario
Best Film 2011: We Have a Pope

Cahiers du cinéma
Best Film 1989: Red Wood Pigeon (ex equo with Do the Right Thing)
Best Film 1994: Caro diario
Best Film 2011: We Have a Pope
Best Film 2015: Mia madre

References

Further reading
 Chatrian, Carlo & Eugenio Renzi. Conversations avec Nanni Moretti, Paris, 2008, Editions des Cahiers du cinéma.
 Mazierska, Ewa & Laura Rascaroli. The Cinema of Nanni Moretti, Wallflower, 2004.

External links

 Interview with Nanni Moretti with his own thoughts on his films, filmlinc.com; accessed 12 December 2014.
 

1953 births
Living people
Male actors from Rome
Italian film directors
Italian humanists
Italian screenwriters
Italian male screenwriters
Italian male film actors
Cannes Film Festival Award for Best Director winners
David di Donatello winners
Ciak d'oro winners
European Film Awards winners (people)
Nastro d'Argento winners
Directors of Palme d'Or winners
People of Venetian descent
People of Campanian descent